The 2019 ITTF Women's World Cup was a table tennis competition held in Chengdu, China, from 18 to 20 October 2019. It was the 23rd edition of the ITTF-sanctioned event.

Qualification

In total, 20 players qualified for the World Cup:

 The current World Champion
 18 players from the five Continental Cups held during 2019
 A wild card, selected by the ITTF

A maximum of two players from each association could qualify.

Notes

Competition format

The tournament consisted of two stages: a preliminary group stage and a knockout stage. The players seeded 9 to 20 were drawn into four groups, with three players in each group. The top two players from each group then joined the top eight seeded players in the second stage of the competition, which consisted of a knockout draw.

Seeding

The seeding list was based on the official ITTF world ranking for October 2019.

Preliminary stage

The preliminary group stage took place on 18 October, with the top two players in each group progressing to the main draw.

Main draw

The knockout stage took place from 19-20 October.

See also
2019 World Table Tennis Championships
2019 ITTF World Tour
2019 ITTF Men's World Cup
2019 ITTF Team World Cup

References

External links
Tournament page on ITTF website

Women
World Cup (women)
Table tennis competitions in China
ITTF Women's World Cup
ITTF Women's World Cup